Chili Bouchier (born Dorothy Irene Boucher; 12 September 1909 – 9 September 1999) was an English film actress who achieved success during the silent film era, and went on to many screen appearances with the advent of sound films, before progressing to theatre later in her career.

Career
Dorothy Irene Boucher was the daughter of an assessor for a painting and decorating firm. As a child, her initial ambition was to be a dancer and she enrolled at a ballet school. She made her first appearance as a child dancer at a charity performance. She became a typist on leaving school and later a model at Harrod's, where her brother worked. Her first appearance was as a bathing belle in Shooting Stars. Bouchier won a contest run by the Daily Mail in 1927 to become a film star.

In 1928, she appeared in a short film made in the DeForest Phonofilm sound-on-film process, Ain't She Sweet, with Dick Henderson. She was known as Britain's "It girl", and the answer to Clara Bow in Hollywood, who was famous for the tag.

She achieved success in the 1930s with the films Carnival (1931), directed by Herbert Wilcox and Gypsy (1937). The latter was made by the British arm of Warner Brothers at Teddington Studios, but, like a number of her films, is considered to be lost. She also played the supporting role of Cleopatra in The Ghost Goes West, starring Robert Donat. During this period, she was brought over to Warner Brothers in Hollywood but broke her contract after being kept hanging around. This reportedly caused her to be blackballed and unable to make another film. Hollywood film producer and business magnate Howard Hughes proposed to her, but Bouchier's great love was the bandleader Teddy Joyce, to whom she was engaged before his premature death.

Despite this setback, she continued to appear in British films until 1960, albeit often in supporting roles in B-movies. Among her later films were Murder in Reverse? (1945), a successful thriller starring William Hartnell, and Old Mother Riley's New Venture (1949), part of the successful series of Old Mother Riley comedy films.

Bouchier combined her film career with a great deal of stage work in the UK. From 1950, onwards most of her appearances were on stage in dramas, comedies and revues, where she continued to work until well into her eighties.

Marriages
In September 1929, she married the actor Harry Milton (1900-1965) whom she had met on set while filming Chick. The marriage was dissolved in 1937. She married 23 year-old actor Peter De Greef in 1946 at Kensington in London. They separated a few months later and the  marriage was finally dissolved in 1955.

Later years
In 1996, Bouchier published her autobiography, Shooting Star, and received some media attention: she was a guest on the BBC Radio 4 series Desert Island Discs in January, and was the subject of This Is Your Life in February, when she was surprised by Michael Aspel at a book signing session at  Harrods. Featured guests were Patricia Roc, Sian Phillips, Peggy Mount, Avril Angers, Lionel Blair, Mary Millar, Dorothy Tutin, Douglas Fairbanks Jr., Leslie Ash and Petula Clark.

Death
Bouchier died three days short of her ninetieth birthday in her ground floor flat in Marylebone, London following a serious fall.

Her agent, Vincent Shaw, said of her after her death, "She was one of the last of the great pre-war beauties - a fabulous trouper and a lovely lady." Author Michael Thornton, a close friend, said: "Her life was a rollercoaster. She had known great wealth and acclaim, but sadly died alone in virtual poverty in a tiny council flat supported financially by theatrical charities. John Paul Getty was marvellous to her, and always had a crate of champagne delivered to her flat on every birthday. He will be sad to hear of her death."

Selected filmography

 Mumsie (1927)
 A Woman in Pawn (1927) - Elaine
 Shooting Stars (1927) - Winnie - Bathing Beauty
 Dawn (1928) - Minor Role (uncredited)
 Maria Marten (1928) - Minor Role (uncredited)
 Palais de danse (1928) - No. 2
 Chick (1928) - Minnie Jarvis
 You Know What Sailors Are (1928) - The Spanish Captain's Daughter
 The Silver King (1929) - Olive Skinner
 Downstream (1929) - Lena
 City of Play (1929) - Ariel
 Warned Off (1930) - Florrie Greville
 Kissing Cup's Race (1930) - Gabrielle
 Enter the Queen (1930, Short) - Marjorie Manners
 Call of the Sea (1930) - Poquita
 Brown Sugar (1931) - Ninon de Veaux
 Carnival (1931) - Simonetta Steno
 The Blue Danube (1932) - Yutka
 Ebb Tide (1932) - Cassie
 The King's Cup (1933) - Betty Conway
 Summer Lightning (1933) - Sue Brown
 Purse Strings (1933) - Mary Willmore
 It's a Cop (1934) - Babette
 To Be a Lady (1934) - Diana Whitcombe
 The Office Wife (1934, Short) - Linda
 Death Drives Through (1935) - Kay Lord
 Royal Cavalcade (1935) - Landgirl
 The Mad Hatters (1935) - Vicki
 Honours Easy (1935) - Kate
 Lucky Days (1935) - Patsy Cartwright
 Get Off My Foot (1935) - Marie
 Mr. Cohen Takes a Walk (1935) - Julia Levine
 The Ghost Goes West (1935) - Cleopatra
 Faithful (1936) - Pamela Carson
 Where's Sally? (1936) - Sonia
 Southern Roses (1936) - Estrella Estrello
 Gypsy (1937) - Hassina
 Mayfair Melody (1937) - Carmen
 The Minstrel Boy (1937) - Dee Dawn
 Change for a Sovereign (1937) - Countess Rita
 The Singing Cop (1938) - Kit Fitzwillow
 The Dark Stairway (1938) - Betty Trimmer
 Mr. Satan (1938) - Jacqueline Manet
 The Return of Carol Deane (1938) - Anne Dempster
 Everything Happens to Me (1938) - Sally Green
 The Mind of Mr. Reeder (1939) - Elsa Weford
 My Wife's Family (1941) - Rosa Latour
 Facing the Music (1941) - Anna Braun
 Murder in Reverse? (1945) - Doris Masterick
 The Laughing Lady (1946) - Louise
 Mrs. Fitzherbert (1947) - Norris
 The Case of Charles Peace (1949) - Katherine Dyson
 Old Mother Riley's New Venture (1949) - Cora
 Blueprint for Danger (1952) - Babs
 The Counterfeit Plan (1957) - Gerta - Housekeeper
 The Boy and the Bridge (1959) - Publican's Wife
 Dead Lucky (1960) - Mrs. Winston (final film role)

References

External links

The archives of Chili Bouchier are held at The Women's Library at the Library of the London School of Economics, ref 7CHB
Obituary in The Independent

1909 births
1999 deaths
English film actresses
English silent film actresses
Actresses from London
20th-century English actresses
English stage actresses